Neša Paripović (born 1942) is a Serbian artist. He is considered a key protagonists of Conceptual art in Serbia (then part of the former Yugoslavia) in the 1970s. He was married to Marina Abramović from 1971 to 1976.

See also
 List of painters from Serbia

References

1942 births
Living people
Yugoslav artists
Serbian contemporary artists